The 2024 California State Assembly election will be held on Tuesday, November 5, 2024, with the primary election being held on June 4, 2024. All of the seats of the California State Assembly will be elected as part of the 2024 California elections.

Retiring incumbents 
1st: Megan Dahle (R–Bieber): Retiring to run for State Senate
8th: Jim Patterson (R–Fresno): Termed out of office
19th: Phil Ting (D–San Francisco): Termed out of office
41st: Chris Holden (D–Pasadena): Termed out of office
43rd: Laura Friedman (D-Glendale): Retiring to run for Congress
53rd: Freddie Rodriguez (D–Pomona): Termed out of office
57th: Reggie Jones-Sawyer (D–Los Angeles): Termed out of office
62nd: Anthony Rendon (D–Lakewood): Termed out of office
75th: Marie Waldron (R–Valley Central): Termed out of office
76th: Brian Maienschein (D–San Diego): Termed out of office

See also
 2024 California elections
 2024 California State Senate election

References

State Assembly
California State Assembly
California State Assembly elections